White's Ferry was the last remaining cable ferry service that carried cars, bicycles, and pedestrians across the Potomac River between Loudoun County, Virginia and Montgomery County, Maryland. The location offered fishing services and water recreation including canoeing. It transported between 600 to 800 customers daily until closing in 2020.

History

Early settlers recognized that the relatively still waters of the Potomac River at the location would provide an ideal location for a ferry. One of the earliest mentions of the ferry appeared in an act of the Maryland General Assembly passed on December 27, 1791 (Liber JG. No. 1, folio 447):

A road map published in the Maryland Land Records for Montgomery County in 1795 (Liber F-6, folio 195) showed a side road near Seneca Bridge coming off the main road between Georgetown and the mouth of the Monocacy River labeled "Road to Conrad Mire's ferry." Another early mention of the ferry appeared in the book: "The life and adventures of Robert Bailey, from his infancy up to December 1821" written by himself: "From the house of this good man, I crossed at Conrood's ferry, and went to Montgomery County, in Maryland, where I once more (after an absence of nearly six years,) had the heart feeling gratification of beholding my dear and affectionate mother and my kind and loving sister." Assuming the book is chronological, the crossing apparently took place after December 15, 1778. But, "The Moco Show" claims that the ferry was opened to the public in 1786. The following advertisement appeared in the National Intelligencer on Thursday, February 1, 1821: "Ranaway in September last, Abraham Dublin, a black man; from Geo. Ward, Montg. Co, Md; living about 17 miles from Gtwn, on the road leading to Coonrod's ferry." The first known ferry operation at the location was Conrad's Ferry, pronounced contemporaneously by the locals as "Coonrod's Ferry" in 1861. After the Civil War, former Confederate officer Elijah V. White purchased it and made many improvements to the service. He named his ferry boat in honor of his former commander, General Jubal Early. The ferry boat was renamed "Historic White's Ferry" in June 2020.

Currently, the ferry is owned by Malcolm Brown, whose father purchased the location in 1946 with other business partners. He eventually bought out his partners and shipped new ferries from Baltimore in 1953 and from Norfolk in 1988; both of which were named after Confederate General Jubal A. Early because of his, "rebellious, no surrender attitude".

The Confederate statue that had been moved from Rockville to White's Ferry in 2017, was moved to a private storage location by the owners on June 16, 2020, although the base of the monument remains.

Each May, White's Ferry hosts an event honoring wounded soldiers recovering at Walter Reed Army Medical Center. Escorted to the area by a large motorcycle honor guard, the soldiers enjoy a day of music, food, fishing, and rides on the ferry. The event is sponsored by the town of Poolesville, Maryland, and receives support from many groups and individuals within the community.

On September 13, 2006, the United States Coast Guard ordered White's Ferry to be shut down because the operator was unlicensed. The ferry continued to operate regardless. The next day the Coast Guard allowed the ferry to resume operations after the owners assured the Coast Guard that there would be licensed individuals on the vessel. For operating without a licensed operator the ferry was fined $8,000, which it could appeal.

On December 28, 2020, the owners of White's Ferry ceased operation after a decade-long lawsuit in the Circuit Court of Loudoun County over their use of private land for a Virginia landing. The decision to cease operation of the ferry was a unilateral decision made by White's Ferry, Inc., which operates the privately owned ferry. Judge Stephen E. Sincavage decided the case against White's Ferry on November 23, 2020, awarding Rockland Farm damages for trespass, damage to property and breach of contract.

In February 2021, White's Ferry was purchased by Loudoun County businessman Chuck Kuhn with plans to revive its operation by either buying or negotiating a permanent easement on the Virginia landing site. In August 2021, Kuhn said Loudoun County may need to exercise eminent domain over the private Virginia dock site to restore service.

Because the ferry link is part of the region's transportation network, as of April 2021, Montgomery County and Loudon County are coordinating to identify technical solutions and support the resolution of issues between private parties to re-establish the connection.

In popular culture
Maryland rock band Clutch has a song titled "White's Ferry", written about the sights frontman Neil Fallon saw on a drive around some country roads in Maryland and Virginia that took him over the Potomac on the ferry.

References

External links 

 White’s Ferry Operations - Alternative Study. October 20, 2021

External links

 Official website, archived June 3, 2009
 The History of White's Ferry from Poolesville.com via Internet Archive
 
 The life and adventures of Robert Bailey, from his infancy up to December 1821. Interspersed with anecdotes, and religious and moral admonitions. Written by himself. Major Robert Bailey

Ferries of Maryland
Ferries of Virginia
Crossings of the Potomac River
Transportation in Loudoun County, Virginia
Transportation in Montgomery County, Maryland
1828 establishments in the United States
Journey Through Hallowed Ground National Heritage Area
Cable ferries in the United States
Jubal A. Early